Pierre Lubac (born 17 February 1968) is a French sprint canoer who competed from the late 1980s to the early 2000s (decade). Competing in four Summer Olympics, he earned his best finish of fifth in the K-2 1000 m event at Atlanta in 1996.

References
Sports-reference.com profile

1968 births
Canoeists at the 1988 Summer Olympics
Canoeists at the 1992 Summer Olympics
Canoeists at the 1996 Summer Olympics
Canoeists at the 2000 Summer Olympics
French male canoeists
Living people
Olympic canoeists of France